Norah Allison McGuinness (7 November 1901 – 22 November 1980) was an Irish painter and illustrator.

Early life
Norah McGuinness was born in County Londonderry. She attended life classes at Derry Technical School and from 1921 studied at the Dublin Metropolitan School of Art  under Patrick Tuohy ( 1894–1930 ), Oswald Reeves ( 1870–1967 ) and Harry Clarke. Through Clarke she obtained a commission to illustrate Sterne's A Sentimental Journey (London, 1926). She attended the Chelsea Polytechnic in London before spending the 1920s working in Dublin as a book illustrator and stage designer.

She settled in 1925 in Wicklow and was involved in the literary and theatrical life of Dublin, designing for the Abbey and Peacock theatres and illustrating W. B. Yeats’s Stories of Red Hanrahan (London, 1927).

On Mainie Jellett’s advice she went to Paris in 1929 to study with André Lhôte and came under the influence of the Ecole de Paris.

She married the editor Geoffrey Phibbs, but they divorced in 1930 after Phibbs had left her more than once, notably for the poet Laura Riding.

From there she moved to London where she was a member of Lucy Wertheim's 'Twenties Group' and of the avant-garde London Group. From 1937-39 she lived in New York. After New York, she returned to Ireland in 1939, settled in Dublin and concentrated on painting. She died in County Dublin.

Work
Although her work remained figurative, she painted vivid, highly coloured landscapes; her work shows the cubist influence of Lhote and she was associated with the modern movement in Ireland. She helped found the Irish Exhibition of Living Art in 1943 and became its president in 1944 after the death of Mainie Jellett.

With Nano Reid she represented Ireland in the 1950 Venice Biennale. This was the first time Ireland participated in this international exhibition. By 2017, the official list of artists representing Ireland since 1950 showed that the majority of artists chosen in the years since McGuinness and Reid's participation were women. She was elected an honorary member of the Royal Hibernian Academy in 1957, but later resigned.

There was a retrospective of her work in the Douglas Hyde Gallery, Trinity College Dublin in 1968, and in 1973 the college awarded her an honorary doctorate. Her work featured in IMMA’s 2013 ‘Analysing Cubism’ exhibition.

Work in collections
Crawford Art Gallery, Cork
The Irish Museum of Modern Art
The National Gallery of Ireland
Portrait of Michael Scott 
Portrait of Denis Johnston
The Startled Bird
Dublin City Gallery The Hugh Lane
The Victoria and Albert Museum London
The Arts Council of Ireland
The Arts Council of Northern Ireland, including
 Inlet (1976)
Meath County Council, including
 The Ochre Mines, Avoca (1955?)
The National Library of Ireland

External links and references

S.B. Kennedy (2002), McGuinness, Norah in Brian Lalor (Ed.), The Encyclopedia of Ireland. Dublin: Gill and Macmillan. 
David Scott (1989), The Modern Art Collection, Trinity College Dublin. Dublin: Trinity College Dublin Press, Dublin. .
Meath County Council biographical note
Norah McGuinness illustrations for a 1926 edition of Laurence Sterne's Tristram Shandy
Norah McGuinness works on Artnet

1901 births
1980 deaths
20th-century Irish painters
20th-century Irish women artists
Alumni of the National College of Art and Design
Irish expatriates in the United Kingdom
Irish expatriates in the United States
Irish illustrators
Irish watercolourists
Irish women painters
People from County Dublin
People from County Londonderry
Women watercolorists